Ameiva reticulata is a species of teiid lizard endemic to Peru.

References

Ameiva
Reptiles described in 2015
Lizards of South America
Reptiles of Peru
Taxa named by Caroll Z. Landauro
Taxa named by Pablo J. Venegas
Taxa named by Antonio Garcia-Bravo